Marshall Belford Allen (born May 25, 1924) is an American free jazz and avant-garde jazz alto saxophone player. He also performs on flute, oboe, piccolo, and EWI (an electronic valve instrument made by Steiner, Crumar company).

Allen is best known for his work with Sun Ra, having recorded and performed mostly in this context since the late 1950s, and having led The Sun Ra Arkestra since 1993, after Sun Ra's death. Critic Jason Ankeny describes Marshall as "one of the most distinctive and original saxophonists of the postwar era."

Biography
Marshall Allen was born in Louisville, Kentucky, United States.

During the Second World War he enlisted in the 92nd Infantry Division and was stationed in France. Allen studied alto saxophone in Paris and played in Europe with Art Simmons and James Moody.

He is best known for his mastery of explosive, jarring, chaotic sound effects on the alto saxophone.  Some have referred to this as a "pyrotechnic" playing style.  He has said that he "wanted to play on a broader sound basis rather than on chords" (1971 interview with Tam Fiofori)). The opportunity came through his long association with Sun Ra, with whom he performed almost exclusively from 1958 to Ra's death in 1993, although he did record outside The Sun Ra Arkestra, with Paul Bley's group in 1964 and Olatunji's group during the mid-1960s. Critic Scott Yanow has described Allen's playing as "Johnny Hodges from another dimension".

Since Sun Ra died, Allen has led the Arkestra, and has recorded two albums as their bandleader. In May 2004, Allen celebrated his 80th birthday on stage with the Arkestra, as part of their performance at the Ninth Vision Festival in New York City. Allen gave other performances on his birthday in 2008 at Sullivan Hall and at Iridium Jazz Club in 2018, both in New York City.

Allen often appeared in New York-area collaborations with bassist Henry Grimes, and has also participated in the "Innerzone Orchestra" together with Francisco Mora Catlett, Carl Craig and others in an appreciation of Sun Ra's music.

In 2022, a building at 5626 Morton Street known as the Arkestral Institute of Sun Ra was listed as a historic landmark in the Philadelphia Register of Historic Places. Allen began living there in 1968.

Discography

For Recordings With Sun Ra See: Sun Ra

As leader
1998: Mark–n–Marshall: Monday (CIMP)
1998: Mark–n–Marshall: Tuesday (CIMP)
2000: PoZest (CIMP)

As co-leader
2003: The All-Star Game (Eremite) with Hamid Drake, Kidd Jordan, William Parker, and Alan Silva
2003: Opportunities & Advantages (CIMP) with Elliott Levin and the Tyrone Hill Quintet
2005: Ten by Two (Edisun) with Terry Adams
2005: Cosmic Tsunami (Nolabel) with Michael Ray, Toshi Makihara, and Jeffrey Shurdut
2010: Night Logic (RogueArt) with Matthew Shipp and Joe Morris
2011: Vibrations of the Day (Re:konstruKt) with Konstrukt, Hüseyin Ertunç, and Barlas Tan Özemek
2014: Two Stars in the Universe (Little Rocket) with Kash Killion
2019: Ceremonial Healing (RareNoiseRecords) with Danny Ray Thompson, Jamie Saft, Trevor Dunn, Balázs Pándi, and Roswell Rudd
2020: Flow States (ScienSonic) with Roscoe Mitchell, Scott Robinson, and  Milford Graves

As sideman
With Terry Adams
 Terrible (New World Records, 1995)

With Paul Bley
Barrage (ESP-Disk, 1965)

With Tyrone Hill
Out of the Box (CIMP, 1998)

With Medeski, Martin and Wood
The Dropper (Blue Note, 2000)

With The Muffins and Knoel Scott
Loveletter #2 The Ra Sessions (Hobart Films & Records, 2005)

With the Odean Pope Trio
In This Moment (CIMP, 2016)

With Alan Silva
H.Con.Res.57/Treasure Box (Eremite, 2003)

With Dave Soldier
The Eighth Hour of Amduat (Mulatta Records, 2016)

With Surrender to the Air
 Surrender to the Air (Elektra, 1996)

With Hawk Tubley & The Airtight Chiefs
Cooking With Dynamite! (2011)

References

External links

 Official website of the Sun Ra Arkestra under the direction of Marshall Allen
 

1924 births
Living people
African-American saxophonists
Free jazz saxophonists
Free jazz flautists
American jazz alto saxophonists
American male saxophonists
American jazz flautists
American jazz oboists
American male jazz musicians
Male oboists
Sun Ra Arkestra members
Avant-garde jazz flautists
Avant-garde jazz saxophonists
Military personnel from Louisville, Kentucky
Musicians from Louisville, Kentucky
United States Army personnel of World War II
Jazz musicians from Kentucky
21st-century saxophonists
Surrender to the Air members
RogueArt artists
21st-century flautists